The Warren G. Magnuson Health Sciences Center is part of the University of Washington in Seattle and the world's largest single university building  with a total floor area of . Although the building is made up of over 20 wings built over more than 50 years, the interior hallways are fully connected. The Magnuson Health Sciences Building is also referred to as the Health Sciences Building or Health Sciences Complex.

Uses
Wings denoted by double letters (AA, BB, NN, SP, etc.) house a teaching hospital, the University of Washington Medical Center. Wings denoted with a single letter (A, B, T, etc.) house a variety of health-related academic disciplines including the University of Washington School of Dentistry, the University of Washington School of Medicine, the University of Washington School of Pharmacy, the University of Washington School of Public Health, and the University of Washington School of Nursing. The building has everything from administration offices to wet laboratories to lecture halls.

History
Construction of the original Health Sciences Building began in 1947 on what had been the University Golf Links south of Pacific Street along Portage Bay. It had 8 wings denoted A through G featuring sculptures by Dudley Pratt and was designed by architecture firm Naramore, Bain, Brady, Johanson, McCellan & Jones (later NBBJ). A commemorative plaque inside the original C-Wing lobby notes that it had "about 3,000,000 square feet of space." However, the original architectural design is largely obscured by later additions, particularly the brutalist T-Wing along Pacific St.

The largest single addition to the building was the  University Hospital in 1959 (previously Harborview Medical Center had been the only teaching hospital for the University of Washington School of Medicine). The tallest wing in the complex is the 17-story Aagaard Tower (BB-Wing).

The building takes its name from U.S. Senator Warren G. Magnuson, who graduated from the University of Washington in 1929.

References 

University of Washington campus
University and college academic buildings in the United States